Parmacella festae is a species of air-breathing land snail, a terrestrial pulmonate gastropod mollusk in the family Parmacellidae.

Distribution 
The distribution of this species includes:
 Northern Egypt
 Northern Libya

Description 
The animal is  an evenly light ochreous cream in color. The mantle is up to 30 mm long. The whole animal is up to 55 mm long.

The shell has a thick and golden-yellow apex which is covered with minute pits regularly arranged in spiral rows (only visible under magnification when the shell is dried).

References
This article incorporates public domain text from the reference.

Parmacellidae
Gastropods described in 1925